Olímpio Cipriano (born 9 April 1982) is an Angolan basketball player who currently plays for Petro de Luanda and the Angola national team. A  guard, he has been one of the most decorated basketball players in Angolan history, having won 12 Angolan Leagues and 11 Angolan Cups in his career. 

Born in Luanda, Cipriano represented the Angola national basketball team on several international tournaments and won four gold AfroBasket medals for his country. Cipriano also won five FIBA Africa Clubs Champions Cup titles, four with Primeiro and one with Libolo; he was honoured as MVP of the tournament in 2007.

Professional career
Cipriano played with the Detroit Pistons' summer league team before being cut prior to the start of the 2007–08 NBA season.

National team career
Cipriano played with Angola on several tournaments, including the 2004 Summer Olympics and the FIBA Africa Championship 2005. At the 2005 tournament, Cipriano led the Angolans to defeat Senegal to capture first place for the 4th championship in a row. Cipriano was also MVP of the tournament. He was also a member of the Angola squad at the 2006 FIBA World Championship, where he averaged 13.8 points per game, including a high of 33 in a losing effort against Germany.

Awards and accomplishments

Club
Primeiro de Agosto
4× FIBA Africa Clubs Champions Cup: (2002, 2004, 2007, 2008)
8× Angolan League: (2001, 2002, 2003, 2004, 2005, 2008, 2009, 2022)
6× Taça de Angola: (2002, 2003, 2005, 2006, 2009, 2022)
9× Angolan Super Cup: (2001, 2002, 2003, 2004, 2005, 2007, 2008, 2009, 2021)
Benfica do Libolo
FIBA Africa Clubs Champions Cup: (2014)
3× Angolan League: (2012, 2014, 2017)
5× Taça de Angola: (2010, 2011, 2015, 2016, 2017)
3× Angolan Super Cup: (2012, 2016, 2017)
Taça Victorino Cunha: (2013)
Petro de Luanda
2× Angolan League: (2019, 2021)
Taça de Angola: (2022)

Individual
FIBA Africa Clubs Champions Cup MVP: (2007)
2×  FIBA Africa Clubs Champions Cup All-Star Team: (2007, 2012)
4× Angolan League MVP: (2008, 2011, 2012, 2017)
3× Angolan League Top Scorer: (2007, 2008, 2012)
Angolan League assists leader: (2011)

Career statistics

BAL

|-
|style="text-align:left;"|2021
|style="text-align:left;"|Petro de Luanda
| 6 || 0 || 15.9 || .359 || .324 || .750 || 2.3 || 1.0 || .3 || .0 || 7.0
|- class="sortbottom"
| style="text-align:center;" colspan="2"|Career
| 6 || 0 || 15.9 || .359 || .324 || .750 || 2.3 || 1.0 || .3 || .0 || 7.0

References

External links
 

1982 births
Living people
African Games gold medalists for Angola
African Games medalists in basketball
Angolan expatriate basketball people in the United States
Angolan men's basketball players
Atlético Petróleos de Luanda basketball players
Basketball players at the 2004 Summer Olympics
Basketball players at the 2008 Summer Olympics
Basketball players from Luanda
C.D. Primeiro de Agosto men's basketball players
C.R.D. Libolo basketball players
Competitors at the 2003 All-Africa Games
Olympic basketball players of Angola
Shooting guards
Small forwards
2006 FIBA World Championship players
2010 FIBA World Championship players
2014 FIBA Basketball World Cup players
2019 FIBA Basketball World Cup players